Aedes (Finlaya) albotaeniatus is a species complex of zoophilic mosquito belonging to the genus Aedes. It is found in Sri Lanka, India, Malaya, and Sumatra.

References

External links
An updated checklist of species of Aedes and Verrallina of northeastern India.

albotaeniatus